Affiliated to Tehran Municipality, Iranian House of Cartoon (خانه کاریکاتور ایران) was founded in 1996. In addition to hosting temporary exhibitions & acting as an educational center of cartoon & animation, it has been the permanent secretariat of Tehran International Cartoon Biennial. Its Sponsor is Municipality of Tehran and the goals of this organization is the recognition, upgrading and propagation of cartoon and caricature in Iran and World, so as to encourage and support Iranian and Foreign cartoonists and fans and introduce their works both in Iran and the world.

References 

Art museums and galleries in Iran